Emarginula sicula is a species of sea snail, a marine gastropod mollusk in the family Fissurellidae, the keyhole limpets.

Distribution
This species occurs in the Mediterranean Sea off Sicily.

References

 Deshayes, G. P., 1832 -Expédition scientifique en Morée, entreprise et publiée par ordre du Gouvernement français. Zoologie, 1ère Partie, Mollusques, sér. 3ème série, p. 81-203, pls 18-24
 Gofas, S.; Le Renard, J.; Bouchet, P. (2001). Mollusca. in: Costello, M.J. et al. (eds), European Register of Marine Species: a check-list of the marine species in Europe and a bibliography of guides to their identification. Patrimoines Naturels. 50: 180-213.

External links
 Philippi, R. A. (1836). Enumeratio molluscorum Siciliae cum viventium tum in tellure tertiaria fossilium, quae in itinere suo observavit. Vol. 1. I-XIV, 1-303, Tab. XIII-XXVIII. Schropp, Berlin
 Deshayes G.P. (1830-1832). Encyclopédie méthodique ou par ordre de matières. Histoire naturelle des Vers et Mollusques. Vol. 2
 Risso, A. (1826-1827). Histoire naturelle des principales productions de l'Europe Méridionale et particulièrement de celles des environs de Nice et des Alpes Maritimes. Paris, Levrault:. . 3(XVI): 1-480, 14 pls.
 Aradas A. (1846). Memorie di Zoologia Siciliana. Memoria Iª. Descrizione di varie specie nuove di conchiglie viventi e fossili della Sicilia. Atti dell'Accademia Gioenia di Scienze Naturali. (2) 3: 157-184
 Pallary, P. (1900). Coquilles marines du littoral du département d'Oran. Journal de Conchyliologie. 48(3): 211-422
 Piani P. (1985). Revisione del genere Emarginula Lamarck, 1801 in Mediterraneo. Lavori, Società Italiana di Malacologia 21: 193-238

Fissurellidae
Gastropods described in 1825
Taxa named by John Edward Gray